Shamsur Rahman is a male Muslim given name, meaning sun of the Most Gracious. 
Notable bearers of the name include

Shamsur Rahman (politician) (1915-2008), Bangladeshi politician, Member of 3rd Pakistan National Assembly
Gazi Shamsur Rahman (1921–1998), Bangladeshi judge, writer and television personality
Shamsur Rahman (poet) (1929–2006), Bangladeshi poet, columnist and journalist
Shamsur Rahman Kallu (1932-1994), intelligence officer and a general in the Pakistan Army
Shamsur Rahman Faruqi (born 1935), Indian poet, Urdu critic and theorist
Shamsur Rahman (cricketer) (born 1988), Bangladeshi cricketer
Shams Ur Rehman Alavi, Indian journalist

Arabic masculine given names